Mai's is a Vietnamese restaurant in Houston, Texas that first opened in 1978.

It is located in Midtown.

History
Originally opened in 1978 by Phin and Phac Nguyen, Mai's was the first restaurant in Houston to feature Vietnamese cuisine.  The couple named the restaurant after their daughter, who took over the business in 1990. Her name means "golden flower", and this meaning, of significance to the family, along with its relatively simple pronunciation, was a reason for its selection. Mai had a signature dish, a beef stew.

A fire on February 15, 2010 caused most of the roof to collapse. The fire did not cause any injuries reported to authorities.

Authorities determined the incident was caused by a wok that caught fire. The restaurant re-opened on April 16, 2011.  The business has since been passed down to Mai's daughter Anna. Phin Nguyen died in 2017.

Anthony Bourdain visited Mai's when he went to Houston in 2015. That year he stated the restaurant gave him "The first great meal and most memorable great meal I had in Houston".

See also

 History of the Vietnamese-Americans in Houston
 List of Vietnamese restaurants

References

External links
Official website

1978 establishments in Texas
Asian-American culture in Houston
Midtown, Houston
Restaurants established in 1978
Asian restaurants in Texas
Vietnamese restaurants in the United States
Vietnamese-American culture in Texas
Restaurants in Houston